Pristimantis inguinalis is a species of frog in the family Strabomantidae. It is found in Guyana, Suriname, French Guiana, and northern Brazil (Amapá state). The type locality is New River, in the disputed area claimed by both Guyana and Suriname. Common names New River robber frog and New River South American rain frog have been coined for it.

Description
Adult males measure on average  in snout–vent length. Specimens from French Guiana have light brown dorsal surface with large brownish black markings. The marking behind the head is W-shaped, and another is a chevron. Supralabial bars are black. Ventral surface is light gray with numerous small black dots (Fouquet et al. describe it as black). There is a yellowish orange spot in the groin. The iris is gray to reddish and has fine, irregular black lines. Specimens from Kaieteur National Park (Guyana) have more variable coloration, with dorsum greenish brown, brown, or dark brown. A dorsolateral stripe may be present. The flecks on ventral surfaces are dark brown or white. The iris can be gold in its upper part, reddish gray in the lower.

The male advertisement call is a single note of about 3 kHz emitted every 3–5 seconds.

Habitat and conservation
It is a common species, and no significant threats to it are known. Its range overlaps with several protected areas.

References

inguinalis
Amphibians of Brazil
Amphibians of French Guiana
Amphibians of Guyana
Amphibians of Suriname
Amphibians described in 1940
Taxa named by Hampton Wildman Parker
Taxonomy articles created by Polbot